"Soy Solo Un Secreto" (Eng.: I Am Only a Secret) is the first single of Alejandra Guzmán's thirteen studio album Fuerza. The song was produced by Loris Ceroni and written by José Luis Pagán and Alejandra Guzmán.

The song has become another success for the artist peaking after nine weeks on the chart at number 17 on the Billboard Hot Latin Tracks on the week of February 2, 2008  and number 6 in Mexico. "Soy Sólo Un Secreto" was nominated for Pop Song of the Year at the 21st Lo Nuestro Awards.

Chart performance

References

2007 singles
Alejandra Guzmán songs
Songs written by Alejandra Guzmán
EMI Records singles
2007 songs